Broomielaw is a major thoroughfare in the city of Glasgow, Scotland. It runs adjacent to the River Clyde, on its north bank and forms the southern, waterside boundary of the city's International Financial Services District.

History
Named after Brumelaw Croft the street runs from Jamaica Bridge under the Kingston Bridge to Finnieston Quay. 

Glasgow’s first quay was built at Brumelaw in 1688. In the late 19th and first half of the 20th Centuries Paddle steamers ran from here to the coast for day trips to the seaside and for some business people to commute.

The area is mentioned in some versions of the sea shanty "Donkey Riding":

Was you ever on the Broomielaw
Where the Yanks are all the go
And the boys dance heel-and-toe
Riding on a donkey  

The Broomielaw also features in the "Freedom Come-All-Ye" a popular anti-Imperialist song of the 1960s by Hamish Henderson in the Scots language. The song refers to the role the quay played as a point of departure for the depopulation of Scotland through emigration. 

Nae mair will our bonnie callants
Merch tae war whan our braggarts crousely craw
Nor wee weans frae pitheid an clachan
Murn the ships sailin doun the Broomielaw

References

Streets in Glasgow
History of Glasgow